Stipe Pletikosa (born 8 January 1979) is a Croatian former professional footballer who played as a goalkeeper. As of 29 July 2021, he works at the Croatian Football Federation as the technical director of the national senior and under-21 teams.

Pletikosa began his professional career with Hajduk Split in Croatia, transferred to Shakhtar Donetsk in Ukraine, then joined Spartak Moscow in 2007. After spending one season with Tottenham Hotspur in the English Premier League, he returned to Russia in 2011 with Rostov, then moved to Deportivo de La Coruña of La Liga in 2015, where he retired.

Pletikosa made his international debut for Croatia in 1999, and went on to represent the country in five major tournaments. He is the fourth-most capped player in the history of the Croatian national team after Luka Modrić, Darijo Srna and Ivan Perišić, having made 114 appearances. Pletikosa retired from international football following the 2014 FIFA World Cup.

Club career

Hajduk Split
Pletikosa began his career at Croatian club Hajduk Split. He was selected as first-team goalkeeper for the 1998–99 season by manager Ivan Katalinić, replacing the veteran Tonči Gabrić. Hajduk fans nicknamed him "Octopus" ("Hobotnica") for his excellent reflexes and coordination. In 2002, he was named by magazine Večernji list as Croatian Player of the Year, the only goalkeeper other than Zoran Simović to have won the award.

Shakhtar Donetsk
In 2003, Pletikosa and teammate Darijo Srna transferred to Shakhtar Donetsk for €2 million. Unlike Srna, Pletikosa did not succeed at the club and was subsequently loaned back to Hajduk in 2005. His second spell at Hajduk proved successful and earned him a starting place in Croatia's 2006 World Cup squad. Pletikosa returned to Shakhtar the following season, but found himself second choice to Jan Laštůvka, prompting the goalkeeper to seek a move. Shakhtar accepted a bid of €3 million from Dinamo Zagreb, but Pletikosa rejected the move due to his loyalty to Hajduk, Dinamo's biggest rivals. A loan move to Fulham also fell through as he could not gain a work permit.

Spartak Moscow

On 7 March, the Russian football federation's transfer deadline day, Pletikosa signed a three-year, €3 million contract to join Spartak Moscow. He featured regularly for the first-team until 2009, when he was less favoured by manager Valeri Karpin.

On 31 August 2010, Pletikosa signed a season-long loan with Tottenham Hotspur of the English Premier League. He made his Tottenham debut in a 4–1 home defeat against Arsenal in the League Cup on 21 September 2010. It was his only appearance for the club.

In July 2011, Pletikosa began a trial at Scottish Premier League club Celtic, playing in friendly matches away to Cardiff City and at home to Premier League side Wolverhampton Wanderers. In August 2011, manager Neil Lennon decided not to keep him as a member of the squad.

Rostov
On 6 August 2011, Pletikosa signed a two-year contract with Russian Premier League club Rostov.

Deportivo La Coruña
On 20 December 2015, Pletikosa signed a six-month deal with La Liga side Deportivo de La Coruña, mainly as a replacement for the injured Fabricio.

International career
Pletikosa made his Croatia senior debut as a 20-year-old against Denmark in 1999, winning plaudits for his dog-like reflexes and shot-stopping. But insecurity over the handling of high balls took a heavy toll at the 2000 UEFA European Under-21 Championship in Slovakia, where Croatia finished last in their group.

Pletikosa worked hard to correct the weaknesses in his game. Under former Croatia head coach Mirko Jozić, he became his country's first-choice goalkeeper, playing all three matches at the 2002 FIFA World Cup finals. Pletikosa blossomed, using all of his 1.93-metre frame when dealing with difficult crosses.

Named as Croatia's first-choice goalkeeper at the UEFA Euro 2004 in Portugal, he sustained an injury a few days before the beginning of the tournament and was replaced by reserve goalkeeper Tomislav Butina. Butina retained the position of number one goalkeeper during the qualification rounds for the 2006 World Cup. As a result, Pletikosa appeared in only two qualifying matches. Nevertheless, Pletikosa was chosen over Butina in the finals, since Butina was still recovering from an injury sustained early in the year.

At Euro 2008, Pletikosa was named Man of the Match in Croatia's opening victory against Austria, making many saves to preserve Croatia's 1–0 lead from an early penalty. On 16 June 2008, during the match between Austria and Germany, BBC pundit Alan Hansen stated his belief that Pletikosa had been "the best goalkeeper in the tournament" up to that point, ahead of more well-known contemporaries such as Petr Čech, Gianluigi Buffon and Iker Casillas, although his colleague Alan Shearer said Edwin van der Sar had been equally impressive. However, Buffon, Casillas and Van der Sar were eventually voted to the Team of the Tournament.

On 6 February 2013, Pletikosa played his 100th international match for Croatia, keeping a clean sheet in a 4–0 defeat of South Korea.

In the opening match of the 2014 World Cup, played on 12 June against hosts Brazil, a penalty was given against Croatia with the match tied 1–1. Pletikosa made contact with Neymar's spot kick, but could not prevent it from going in. Croatia eventually lost 3–1. On 17 July 2014, following the World Cup, Pletikosa announced his retirement from the national team.

Personal life
Pletikosa is a practising Roman Catholic who was known to wear a T-shirt with a picture of the Virgin Mary under his uniform for good luck when he played.

Career statistics

Club
Source:

International
Source:

Honours
Hajduk Split
Prva HNL: 2000–01
Croatian Cup: 1999–2000, 2002–03

Shakhtar Donetsk
Vyshcha Liha: 2004–05
Ukrainian Super Cup: 2005

Rostov
Russian Cup: 2013–14

Individual
Heart of Hajduk Award: 2000, 2002
Prva HNL Player of the Year: 2001, 2002
Croatian Footballer of the Year: 2002

See also
List of men's footballers with 100 or more international caps

References

External links
 

1979 births
Living people
Footballers from Split, Croatia
Association football goalkeepers
Croatian footballers
Croatia youth international footballers
Croatia under-21 international footballers
Croatia international footballers
2002 FIFA World Cup players
2006 FIFA World Cup players
UEFA Euro 2008 players
UEFA Euro 2012 players
2014 FIFA World Cup players
FIFA Century Club
HNK Hajduk Split players
FC Shakhtar Donetsk players
FC Spartak Moscow players
Tottenham Hotspur F.C. players
FC Rostov players
Deportivo de La Coruña players
Croatian Football League players
Ukrainian Premier League players
Russian Premier League players
La Liga players
Croatian expatriate footballers
Expatriate footballers in Ukraine
Croatian expatriate sportspeople in Ukraine
Expatriate footballers in Russia
Croatian expatriate sportspeople in Russia
Expatriate footballers in England
Croatian expatriate sportspeople in England
Expatriate footballers in Spain
Croatian expatriate sportspeople in Spain